The following is an episode list for the Univision webnovela Vidas Cruzadas.

Season 1: August 12, 2009 – August 24, 2009

References

Webnovelas